Daehan Tire Industries Co Ltd. is a tire company headquartered in Seoul, Korea and established in 1990. It has been supplying automobile inner tubes and flaps to Kumho Tires on an O.E.M basis since 1991. It also has produced retread tires for trucks and buses for domestic and overseas markets since 1994.

History
1990: Established Daehan Tube Industries Co Ltd. 
1992: Acquired Korean Standards mark for automobile inner tubes. 
1994: Became Daehan Tire Industries Co Ltd., Established facilities for retread tires.

Products
Inner Tube
Flap
Retread Tires

Manufacturing companies based in Seoul
Automotive companies established in 1990
Tire manufacturers of South Korea
Auto parts suppliers of South Korea
South Korean brands